National identification numbering in Iceland was established in 1953 when the birth number system was implemented. In 1959, the name number system was implemented and used parallel to the birth number. The third and present system is the identification number which replaced both previous systems.

Birth number (1953–1988)
The birth number was the first national identification number in Iceland. It was composed of 6 numbers but was later extended to 8 numbers.

Name number (1959–1988)
The name number was the second national identification number in Iceland. It was based on the individual's name and thus allowed alphabetical ordering since computers at the time could not work with the alphabet directly.

Identification number (1987–present)

The identification number is the third and current national identification number in Iceland.

See also
Registers Iceland

References
Watson, Ian (2010). A short history of national identification numbering in Iceland. Bifröst Journal of Social Science — 4

National identification numbers